Cedar Creek may refer to several small streams in the U.S. state of Michigan:

 In Arenac County:
 The Cedar Creek Drain rises in north central Mason Township on the boundary with Iosco County and flows southeasterly into the Au Gres River in Turner Township.
Source: 
Mouth: 
 In Barry County:
The Cedar Creek rises in southeast Hope Township as the outflow of Big Cedar Lake and flows northerly into the Thornapple River in Hastings Township
Source: 
Mouth: 
The North Branch Cedar Creek rises as the outflow of a series of small ponds in northeastern Baltimore Township and flows easterly into the Cedar Creek about a mile before its outflow into the Thornapple River.
Source: 
Mouth: 
 In Cheboygan County:
The Cedar Creek is a short tributary of the Cedar River, rising in northwestern Mentor Township. It flows northerly into Pickerel Lake in southeastern Emmet County, Michigan.
Source: 
Mouth: 
 The Cedar Point Creek is a short stream rising in northeastern Burt Township and flowing southerly into White Goose Bay on Burt Lake.
Source: 
Mouth: 
 In Gogebic County:
The Cedar Creek is a short stream rising in Watersmeet Township and flowing mostly north and east into the Imp Creek.
Source: 
Mouth: 
 In Iron County:
The Cedar Creek is a short stream flowing mostly northerly within Bates Township into the Olson Creek, which flows into the Chicagon Slough, and then to the Paint River.
Source: 
Mouth: 
 In Isabella County:
The Cedar Creek is a short stream flowing mostly northerly with Deerfield Township into the Chippewa River.
Source: 
Mouth: 
 In Kent County:
The Cedar Creek rises in central Nelson Township northeast of the city of Cedar Springs. It flows southwesterly then mostly south into the Rogue River in Algoma Township
Source: 
Mouth: 
The Little Cedar Creek rises in northwestern Courtland Township and flows west and south into the Cedar Creek in Algoma Township
Source: 
Mouth: 
 In Keweenaw County:
The Cedar Creek is a very short stream within Eagle Harbor Township. It flows mostly west and north into Eagle Harbor of Lake Superior.
Source: 
Mouth:

Notes

Rivers of Michigan
Set index articles on rivers of Michigan